was a town located in Higashiusuki District, Miyazaki Prefecture, Japan.

On February 20, 2006, Kitakata, along with the town of Kitaura (also from Higashiusuki District), was merged into the expanded city of Nobeoka.

External links
Official website of Nobeoka

Dissolved municipalities of Miyazaki Prefecture